{{DISPLAYTITLE:C20H23NO}}
The molecular formula C20H23NO (molar mass: 293.40 g/mol, exact mass: 293.1780 u) may refer to:

 Amitriptylinoxide, or amitriptyline N-oxide
 Oxaprotiline, or hydroxymaprotiline
 Quifenadine

Molecular formulas